Hemitrygon is a genus of stingrays in the family Dasyatidae from marine, brackish and freshwater habitats in the central Indo-Pacific and northwest Pacific regions. The genus was formerly regarded as a junior synonym of the genus Dasyatis.

Species
The taxonomy of Hemitrygon requires revision, as some existing species may be synonyms and there may be undescribed species. H. yemenensis was described in 2020 from materials collected nearly 120 years ago and its status in the wild is unknown.
Hemitrygon akajei (Müller & Henle, 1841) (Red stingray)
Hemitrygon bennetti (Müller & Henle, 1841) Bennett's stingray)
Hemitrygon fluviorum (Ogilby, 1908) (Estuary stingray)
Hemitrygon izuensis (Nishida & Nakaya, 1988) (Izu stingray)
Hemitrygon laevigata (Chu, 1960) (Yantai stingray)
Hemitrygon laosensis (Roberts & Karnasuta, 1987) (Mekong freshwater stingray)
Hemitrygon longicauda (Last & W. T. White, 2013) (Merauke stingray)
Hemitrygon navarrae (Steindachner, 1892) (Blackish stingray)
Hemitrygon parvonigra (Last & White, 2008) (Dwarf black stingray)
Hemitrygon sinensis (Steindachner, 1892) (Chinese stingray)
Hemitrygon yemenensis A. B. M. Moore, Last & Naylor, 2020

References

 
Dasyatidae
Taxa named by Johannes Peter Müller & 
Taxa named by Friedrich Gustav Jakob Henle